My Secret Life is an album by Eric Burdon released in 2004. It was his first solo album release, which contains new titles, in nearly 16 years. It was his comeback album.

It features many different musical directions such as jazz, blues, soul, rock, ska, rhythm and blues, folk, boogie, world and pop. Burdon said in an interview that every song is different. The album peaked No. 93 on the German album chart after it sold 20,000 copies in the UK.

Musicians on this album includes Red Young, Martin Gerschwitz, Terry Wilson and Jon Cleary.

Besides presenting the song composed in partnership with the Brazilian rocker Marcelo Nova "Black & White World" Eric Burdon shed to the English and re-recorded two songs of Marcelo Nova: "A Garota da Motocicleta" turned "Motorcycle Girl" while "Coração Satânico" became "Devil's Slide".

The working title was "The coat of many colours".

Track listing

Personnel
 Tony Braunagel – percussion, drums
 Eric Burdon – vocals
 Lenny Castro – percussion
 Jon Cleary – piano
 Mike Finnigan – piano, Hammond organ
 Martin Gerschwitz – Hammond organ, electric piano 
 Bob Glaub – bass guitar
 James "Hutch" Hutchinson – bass guitar
 Nick Lane – trombone
 Darrell Leonard – trumpet, flugelhorn, trombonium
 Reggie McBride – bass guitar
 Ivan Neville – piano, Hammond organ, background vocals, clavinet
 Eric Rigler – Uillean pipes, Irish whistle, whistle
 Michito Sánchez – percussion
 Johnny Lee Schell – guitar, background vocals
 Joe Sublett – soprano sax, tenor sax
 Daniel Timms – Hammond organ, Hammond B3
 Tony B! – percussion
 Gromyko Collins – background vocals
 Valerie Davis  – background vocals
 Julie Delgado – background vocals
 Billy Trudell – background vocals
 Teresa James – background vocals
 Marlena Jeter – background vocals
 Kudisan Kai – background vocals
 Terry Wilson – bass guitar
 Red Young – piano, strings, Hammond organ, electric piano

Production
 Tony Braunagel – producer, audio production
 Eric Burdon – executive producer
 Terry Becker – engineer
 Ed Cherney – mixing
 Jörg Kyas – photography
 Marita – photography
 Johnny Lee Schell – engineer
 Duane Seykora – engineer

References

2004 albums
Eric Burdon albums
SPV/Steamhammer albums